Cameco Corporation (formerly Canadian Mining and Energy Corporation) is the world's largest publicly traded uranium company, based in Saskatoon, Saskatchewan, Canada. In 2015, it was the world's second largest uranium producer, accounting for 18% of world production.

History
The Canadian Mining and Energy Corporation was formed in 1988 by the merger and privatization of two Crown corporations: the federally owned Eldorado Nuclear Limited (known previously as Eldorado Mining and Refining Limited) and Saskatchewan-based Saskatchewan Mining Development Corporation (SMDC).  The name was later shortened to "Cameco Corporation".

The new company was initially owned 62% by the provincial government and 38% by the federal government.  The initial public offering (IPO) for 20% of the company was conducted in July, 1991.  Government ownership of the company decreased over the next eleven years, with full privatization occurring in February, 2002.

In 1996, Cameco acquired Power Resources Inc., the largest uranium producer in the United States.  This was followed in 1998 by the acquisition of Canadian-based Uranerz Exploration and Mining Limited and Uranerz U.S.A., Inc.

In 2008, Cameco purchased a 24% stake in Global Laser Enrichment (GLE), the exclusive licensee of the proprietary Separation of Isotopes by Laser Excitation (SILEX) technology developed by SILEX Systems Limited. GLE is developing this third-generation uranium enrichment technology.  In 2021, Cameco and SILEX purchased  GE-Hitachi's 76% stake in GLE, leaving Cameco with 49% of the company.

In 2011, Cameco signed an agreement with Talvivaara Mining Company whereby Cameco would pay US$60 million to construct a uranium extraction circuit at the Talvivaara nickel-zinc mine in Sotkamo. Talvivaara would then pay back the initial construction costs in the form of uranium concentrate; once the initial costs were paid Cameco would continue to purchase the uranium concentrate at a pricing formula based on market price on the day of delivery.

In 2012, it acquired a nuclear fuel intermediary, Nukem Energy.

In 2016, Cameco suspended operations at its Rabbit Lake mine, due to low uranium prices.  In 2017, it suspended operations for at least 10 months at its McArthur River mine and Key Lake mill, converting that to an indefinite shutdown in 2018 involving the layoff of about 700 staff.

In October 2022, Cameco along with Brookfield Renewable Partners announced the acquisition of Westinghouse Electric Company in a US$7.9billion deal including debt. Cameco will own a 49% interest in the company as part of the deal.

Operations
Cameco operates uranium mines in North America and Kazakhstan, including McArthur River-Key Lake, the world's largest uranium producer, and Cigar Lake, the world's highest grade uranium mine, both in Saskatchewan. Other operations in Saskatchewan include a mine and mill at Rabbit Lake, currently in care and maintenance.

In the United States, Cameco operates uranium mines in the states of Nebraska and Wyoming through its US subsidiary Cameco Resources Inc.  Cameco Resources was formed in 2007 through a restructuring of two wholly owned subsidiaries, Power Resources Inc. (Wyoming) and Crow Butte Resources, Inc. (Nebraska).

In the province of Ontario, Cameco operates a uranium refinery in Blind River and a uranium conversion facility in Port Hope, which has faced opposition from some community groups. Cameco is the exclusive fuel supplier to Bruce Power, which supplies 30% of Ontario's electricity through its nuclear generating plant.  It used to own part of Bruce Power, but it sold its interest in 2014.

In 2004, Cameco spun off its gold mining operations in Kyrgyzstan, Mongolia and the USA to a newly formed public company, Centerra Gold.  Cameco divested its remaining interest in Centerra on December 30, 2009.

In January 2011, Cameco participated in the clean up of a ship-board uranium concentrate spill on the MCP Altona that had occurred on December 23, 2010.

See also

Uranium Participation Corporation
Nuclear power
Anti-nuclear movement in Canada
World Uranium Hearing
Nuclear power in Canada

References

External links
 Cameco's official site

Companies listed on the New York Stock Exchange
Companies listed on the Toronto Stock Exchange
S&P/TSX 60
Nuclear fuel companies
Uranium mining companies of Canada
Companies based in Saskatoon
Nuclear technology in Canada
Mineral exploration
Non-renewable resource companies established in 1988
1988 establishments in Saskatchewan